Johnston-Meek House is a historic home located at Huntington, Cabell County, West Virginia. It is a two-story, brick Colonial Revival style dwelling with a hipped roof.  The original section was built in 1832, with additions in 1838, 1923, and 1941.  The 1923 Colonial Revival entrance portico and a number of other significant modifications were designed by local architect Sidney L. Day.

It was listed on the National Register of Historic Places in 2004.

References

Houses on the National Register of Historic Places in West Virginia
Colonial Revival architecture in West Virginia
Houses completed in 1832
Houses in Huntington, West Virginia
National Register of Historic Places in Cabell County, West Virginia